Pinnacle Canyon Academy is a K-12 charter school, located in Price, Utah. Competing in the 1A division for sports, which includes cross country, girls' volleyball, boys' basketball, girls' basketball, track and field, girls' golf boys' golf.

References

External links 
http://www.pcaschool.com/
http://thepantherpress.wordpress

Schools in Utah